DNA is a 2020 French drama film directed by Maïwenn, from a screenplay by Maïwenn and Mathieu Demy. It stars Fanny Ardant, Louis Garrel, Dylan Robert, Marine Vacth, Caroline Chaniolleau, Alain Françon, Florent Lacger, Henri-Noël Tabary, Omar Marwan and Maïwenn.

The film had its world premiere at the Deauville Film Festival on 11 September 2020. It was released in France on 19 May 2021, by Le Pacte.

Plot
After the loss of her grandfather, Neige explores her heritage.

Cast
 Maïwenn as Neige
 Louis Garrel as François
 Marine Vacth as Lilah
 Fanny Ardant as Caroline
 Dylan Robert as Kevin
 Alain Françon as Pierre
 Caroline Chaniolleau as Françoise
 Florent Lacger as Ali
 Henri-Noël Tabary as Matteo
 Omar Marwan as Emir Fellah

Release
The film was set to premiere at the Cannes Film Festival in May 2020, however the festival was canceled due to the COVID-19 pandemic. It had its world premiere at the Deauville Film Festival on 11 September 2020. Shortly after, Netflix acquired distribution rights to the film in select territories including the United States, Canada, United Kingdom, New Zealand, South Africa and the Middle East. It was scheduled to be released in France on 28 October 2020, by Le Pacte. However, the film was pulled from the schedule due to theater closures due to the pandemic. It was released in the United States on 26 December 2020. It was released in France on 19 May 2021.

Reception

References

External links
 
 

2020 films
2020 drama films
French drama films
Films directed by Maïwenn
Films scored by Stephen Warbeck
French-language Netflix original films
2020s French-language films
2020s French films